The Bluetech International Clean Air Technology Award (also called Bluetech Award), is an annual award presented by the Clean Air Alliance of China (CAAC) to recognize outstanding technologies that prevent and control different forms and sources of air pollution. The award examines each technology for breakthrough potential in terms of technological performance, environmental impact, and financial feasibility with CAAC's standardized technology assessment methodology. The award selection committee consists of technical professionals, industrial experts and testing specialists that are chosen every year to fit each year's award categories. Technologies from around the world are eligible to apply.

The award ceremony, called the Bluetech International Clean Air Forum, features research leaders, industries, investors and policymakers in China and abroad to address global industry and policy trends in the air quality sector. Private follow-up events, held in Beijing and other pilot regions, are organised for Alliance members and selected technology companies.
The first Bluetech Award Ceremony was held on December 12, 2015, in Beijing, China. The second Bluetech Award Ceremony is planned for December 2016.

Winners

References

Further reading
 http://www.marketwired.com/press-release/garlock-receives-prestigious-award-for-advances-in-emissions-control-technology-2089493.htm
 
 http://announce.ft.com/Detail/?DocKey=1323-12627860-1H6SQN9RL5P0D7O1CBKIGI8OR8)
 http://www.cameraitacina.com/en/news/2nd-bluetech-international-air-technology-award

External links
 Official website
 CAAC website

Environmentalism
Pollution in China